Hatiteh (also Romanized as Ḩaţīţeh) is a village in Sahra Rural District, Anabad District, Bardaskan County, Razavi Khorasan Province, Iran. At the 2006 census, its population was 930, in 225 families.

References 

Populated places in Bardaskan County